Omar Doom (born June 29, 1976) is an American actor, musician, and artist.  Doom is best known to film audiences for his role as Private First Class Omar Ulmer in the 2009 film Inglourious Basterds, directed by Quentin Tarantino.

Early life
Omar Doom was born Omar Makhdomi (pronounced Makhdoomi) in Easton, Pennsylvania, to parents Dr. Rashid and Jawahira Makhdomi. Both his parents originate from the Kashmir region of India. His father is a physician at Easton Hospital. He was one of four siblings, including his three sisters. Doom's parents would take the family to a cultural institution or exhibit every week. For example, the family would attend an opera or play in Manhattan, New York City, or a film at a local art house theater.

Doom graduated from Easton Area High School in 1994 and fronted a band called Ordeal, while attending the school. Following graduation, Doom attended Parsons The New School for Design, where he pursued a degree in painting.

Career
Doom returned to a music career after Parsons.  He became the frontman of a two-person electronic rock band called Doomington, along with Stretch Armstrong, a successful DJ and music producer. The duo is now defunct.

Doom met director Quentin Tarantino in Los Angeles in 1998 through mutual friends. They have reportedly been close friends ever since. Tarantino has been known to invite Doom over to his home for movie marathons. At one point, Tarantino held a birthday party for Doom. The party included screening of old television shows, cartoons, as well as films including Hammerhead and The Mack.

Acting
Tarantino encouraged Makhdomi to both pursue an acting career and adopt the shorter stage name, Omar Doom. Doom was not pursuing acting at the time. Instead, he was working as a musician and a co-running a clothing line, called Diabla, with one of his sisters, Saira. Following Tarantino's advice, Doom began studying acting. In an interview during a press junket in Berlin for Inglourious Basterds, Doom described Tarantino's encouragement, "Quentin told me I'd be great in movies. He really pushed me. I decided to go for it. I took his advice, and studied acting.Quentin Tarantino hired Doom for his first acting role, in a small part as Vanessa Ferlito's character's love interest, Nate, in the 2007 film Death Proof. Tarantino further cast Doom in a larger role in his next film, Inglourious Basterds. Doom did not know he was cast in the movie until Tarantino called him two weeks before shooting was scheduled to start. Doom was cast as one of the film's eight Basterds, a group of Jewish American soldiers charged with hunting down and killing Nazi soldiers in occupied France during World War II. Doom attended the Cannes Film Festival with the cast in May 2009.

Music
Doom released an EP under the name STRAIGHT RAZOR on Lil Death Records on August 20th, 2013. The single "Whiskey & Ativan" was accompanied by remixes by Monsieur Monsieur (Bromance Records), Thee Mike B (Play it Down Records) and Sinden (Grizzly). Doom DJ's under the name STRAIGHT RAZOR as well as Omar Doom.

FilmographyGrindhouse (2007) - Nate (segment "Death Proof")Death Proof (2007) - NateInglourious Basterds (2009) - Pfc. Omar UlmerHigher Power (2018)  - DarioOnce Upon a Time in Hollywood'' (2019) - Donnie

References

External links

1976 births
Living people
American male film actors
Easton Area High School alumni
Parsons School of Design alumni
Musicians from Easton, Pennsylvania
Male actors from Pennsylvania
Outstanding Performance by a Cast in a Motion Picture Screen Actors Guild Award winners
American male actors of Indian descent
American people of Kashmiri descent